Broadwell is a village and civil parish in the English county of Gloucestershire.

History
The 1086 Domesday Book records Broadwell as a property of Evesham Abbey.

The Church of England parish church of Saint Paul was built in the 12th and 13th centuries and restored in the 1860s.

The church and churchyard contain tombs of the Chadwell family who owned Broadwell Manor from the 16th century.  

The manor house later passed by inheritance to Mary Chamberlayne who rebuilt it after a fire in 1757. The present 18th century building is Grade II* listed.

Governance
Broadwell is governed locally by a parish council. The civil parish is part of the ward of Fosseridge.  the ward is represented on the Cotswold District Council by Conservative representative David Cunningham.

The village is represented in the House of Commons of the Parliament of the United Kingdom as part of The Cotswolds. It elects one MP by the first past the post system of election. Since its creation for the 1997 general election, The Cotswolds (formerly known as Cotswold) has been represented at Parliament by Conservative MP Geoffrey Clifton-Brown. Prior to 1997, Broadwell was part of the constituency of Cirencester and Tewkesbury. Prior to Brexit in 2020, the village was part of the South West England constituency of the European Parliament.

Demography
At the 2001 UK census, the civil parish of Broadwell had a population of 384. The 2001 population density for the ward of Fosseridge was 0.29 per hectare, with a 100 to 88.6 female-to-male ratio. The proportion of residents who classified themselves as White was 99.2%, a figure higher than those for Cotswold (98.8%), the South West (97.7%) and England (90.9%).

References
Footnotes

Sources

External links

'Parishes: Broadwell', A History of the County of Gloucester: volume 6 (1965), pp. 49-59.

Civil parishes in Gloucestershire
Cotswold District
Villages in Gloucestershire